The Cat Who Came to Breakfast (1994) is the sixteenth mystery novel by Lilian Jackson Braun, one of The Cat Who series.

Qwilleran and his cats solve another mystery, this time at the newly sprouted Breakfast Island, a resort hot spot with an attractive history.  As it turns out, Breakfast Island is only one of several names given to this island that is also called Pear Island (for its shape).  XYZ Developers, an environmentally unconscious consortium buys up the southern part of the island and puts up a gaudy, touristy series of fudge shops, T-shirt shops, pizza shops and a Caribbean Pirate Themed Hotel and Lounge, where a guest is found dead in the pool.

Qwill decides to accept an invitation to stay at Lori and Nick Bamba's Domino Inn so that he can nose around a bit.  Qwill finds out that the country club set own a part of the island that they call Grand Island that includes an exclusive marina.  He also finds out that the long established islanders call the island Providence Island (thanking Providence for their rescue from shipwrecks) and don't really care for the country club set, but strongly dislike the tourists.

Qwill rescues Elizabeth Applehardt, the strange young daughter of one of the most elite families in the country club set, after a snake bite incident.  He then is able to meet this family and learn about their history on the island.  Eventually a 'northern hurricane' destroys the XYZ development and Qwill's K Foundation restores it to its natural beauty.  Elizabeth Applehardt moves to Pickax and starts to develop into a quite capable young lady.

1994 American novels
Came to Breakfast
Novels about cats